Paweł Szwajdych (born 5 July 1983 in Kraków) is a Polish midfielder who plays for Polish side Puszcza Niepołomice.

External links
 

1983 births
Living people
Polish footballers
MKS Cracovia (football) players
ŁKS Łódź players
Footballers from Kraków
Association football midfielders